Ceanothus pinetorum is a species of shrub in the family Rhamnaceae known by the common names Kern ceanothus and Coville ceanothus. It is endemic to the Sierra Nevada of California, where it is known only from the Kern Plateau, a section of the southern Sierra featuring wide meadows and ridges.

Description
This is a low-lying shrub forming a bush or mat under a meter tall but up to about 8 meters in spreading width. The evergreen leaves are oppositely arranged and generally under 2 centimeters long, each firm and hairless with a toothed edge. The inflorescence is a small cluster of blue to off-white flowers yielding horned, wrinkled fruits just under a centimeter long.

References

External links
Jepson Manual Treatment
USDA Plants Profile
Photo gallery

pinetorum
Endemic flora of California
Flora of the Sierra Nevada (United States)
Plants described in 1893